Luiz Eduardo de Oliveira (born December 13, 1944), more famous under his pen name Léo is a Brazilian comics creator.

Biography
After graduating as a mechanical engineer, Oliveira left Brazil because of the then military dictatorship. He lived in Chile until the Chilean coup of 1973, then in Argentina, before returning to Brazil in 1974. He worked as an illustrator in the advertising industry in São Paulo before once more leaving Brazil, this time for France, in 1981. He had hoped to find work illustrating comics, but the Franco-Belgian comics industry was in difficulty at the time so he fell back on advertising once again, with a few comics pieces being published in L'Écho des savanes and Pilote.

In 1986, with the assistance of Jean-Claude Forest, Oliveira began contributing to the youth oriented magazines of Bayard Presse. He illustrated true stories for  magazine. In 1988, he began illustrating the stories of the comics writer . The collaboration proved fruitful, producing eight albums in the series Trent and five of another series, Kenya.

In 1993, Oliveira finally achieved a dream when Dargaud agreed to publish his first solo (writer-artist) series: Aldébaran. This story has continued in the sequel series Bételgeuse and Antarès, the former nominated for the Prize for a Series at the Angoulême International Comics Festival in 2004.

Bibliography
Le Pèlerin de la Paix
Script by Benoît Marchon, artwork by Léo; Éditions du Centurion
Gandhi, le Pèlerin de la Paix - (Gandhi, the Pilgrim of Peace) (1989)

L'Homme Mort - (The Dead Man) (1991, republished in 2000)
Le Kid - (The Kid) (1992)
Quand s'Allument les Lampes... - (When the Lamps Ignite) (1993, republished in 2000)
La Vallée de la Peur - (The Valley of Fear) (1995)
Wild Bill (1996)
Le Pays sans Soleil - (The Country without Sun) (1998)
Miss (1999)
Petit Trent - (Little Trent) (2000)(com

Kenya / Namibia

Apparitions (2001)
Rencontres (2003)
Aberrations (2004)
Interventions (2006)
Illusions (2008)
Intégrale (complete edition, 2009)

Episode 1 (2010)
Episode 2 (2010)
Episode 3 (2012)
Episode 4 (2013)
Episode 5 (2015)

Dexter London
Aventurier Professionnel (2002)
La Traversée du Désert (2003)
Les Sources du Rouandiz (2005)

Les Mondes d'Aldébaran (Worlds of Aldebaran)
Script and artwork by Léo; Dargaud (in French), Cinebook Ltd (in English)

Aldébaran (Aldebaran)
La Catastrophe - (The Catastrophe) (1994, republished in 2001)
La Blonde - (The Blond Woman) (1995, republished in 2001)
La Photo - (The Photograph) (1996, republished in 2001)
Le Groupe - (The Group) (1997, republished in 2001)
La Créature - (The Creature) (1998, republished in 2001)

Bételgeuse (Betelgeuse)
La Planète - (The Planet) (2000)
Les Survivants - (The Survivors) (2001)
L'expédition - (The Expedition) (2002)
Les Cavernes - (The Caves) (2003)
L'autre - (The Other) (2005)

Antares - (released in English by Cinebook)
Episode 1 (2007)
Episode 2 (2009)
Episode 3 (2010)
Episode 4 (2011)
Episode 5 (2013)
Episode 6 (2015)

Les survivants (Survivors) - (released in English by Cinebook)
Episode 1 (2011)
Episode 2 (2012)
Episode 3 (2014)
Episode 4 (2016)

Retour sur Aldebaran (Return to Aldebaran)
Episode 1 (2018)

Episode 1 (2009)
Episode 2 (2009)
Episode 3 (2010)
Episode 4 (2011)
Episode 5 (2012)

 Episode 1, September 2014

Mermaid Project
Script by Léo and Corine Jamar, artwork by Fred Simon; Dargaud (in French), Cinebook Ltd (in English)  
 Tome 1, September 2012
 Tome 2, June 2013
 Tome 3, June 2014
 Tome 4, 2015
 Tome 5, 2017

La Porte de Brazenac
 single album, February 2014

Awards
 2004: nominated for Best International Series at the Prix Saint-Michel, Belgium
 - nominated for the Youth Award (9-12 years) and the Series Award at the Angoulême International Comics Festival, France

References

External links
 
 Dargaud: Leo biography
 Lambiek Comiclopedia: Léo

Living people
1944 births
Brazilian comics writers
Brazilian comics artists
Brazilian expatriates in France
South American writers in French
Dargaud
Brazilian mechanical engineers